The Carroll School is a school for students diagnosed with learning disabilities such as dyslexia. The school consists of a lower school in Waltham, Massachusetts, a Middle School in Lincoln, and an upper school in Wayland, Massachusetts.

History 
The history of The Carroll School dates back to 1967 when a small group of people founded a school for children with language-based learning differences, such as dyslexia. The Middle School campus was first built in 1905 by Helen Storrow. More buildings have been added throughout the campus. The lower campus goes up to grade five. The middle campus goes up to grade eight. The upper school campus is a former mansion, and was bought for $5 Million from businessman John Fish in 2016. Located in Wayland, Massachusetts it serves the two-year 8th-9th grade program as well as the non-academic administration.

References

External links 
 

Schools in Middlesex County, Massachusetts
Educational institutions established in 1967
1967 establishments in Massachusetts